Mazepin is a surname. 

Notable people with the surname include:

 Dmitry Mazepin (born 1968), Belarus-born Russian businessman
 Nikita Mazepin (born 1999), Russian racing driver, son of Dmitry

See also

 

Russian-language surnames